Sir Bernard Rawdon Reilly  (1882–1966) was a senior British diplomat and colonial governor, active in the government of Aden between 1908 and 1940, and the first Governor of Aden between 1937 and 1940.

Biography

Born on 25 March 1882 in Durrington, Wiltshire, Sir Bernard Reilly was educated at Bedford School and entered the British Indian Army in 1902. He transferred to the political department in 1908 and was sent to Aden, then controlled by the Bombay Presidency.

Reilly was appointed Resident in Aden between 1931 and 1932, Chief Commissioner of Aden (after the administration of Aden was transferred to the Government of India in Delhi) between 1932 and 1937, and Governor of Aden (after Aden became a British colony under the control of the Colonial Office in London) between 1937 and 1940. In 1940, Reilly left Aden to join the Colonial Office, and spent the Second World War in London.

Sir Bernard Reilly died in London on 28 October 1966 and was buried at Winchester.

References

British diplomats
1882 births
1966 deaths
People educated at Bedford School
Knights Commander of the Order of St Michael and St George
Companions of the Order of the Indian Empire
Officers of the Order of the British Empire
Aden in World War II
Colony of Aden people